The 2019 season was Viking's 1st year back in Eliteserien, after being promoted last season. It was the club's 69th season in the top flight of Norwegian football. The club participated in the Eliteserien and the Norwegian Cup.

Squad

Out on loan

Transfers

Transfers in

Transfers out

Loans in

Loans out

Notes

Friendlies
On 16 December 2018, Viking announced five friendly matches to be played in pre-season. Five more matches were announced a few weeks later. 

On 31 May 2019, Viking announced two friendly matches to be played in June.

Pre-season

Mid-season

Competitions

Eliteserien

Table

Results summary

Results by round

Matches
The Eliteserien fixtures were announced on 19 December 2018.

Norwegian Cup

Squad statistics

Appearances and goals

|-
|colspan="14"|Players who left Viking during the season:

|}

Goal scorers

References

Viking FK seasons
Viking